Cabinet Bondevik may refer to:
First cabinet Bondevik
Second cabinet Bondevik